Mab-21 like 1 is a protein that in humans is encoded by the MAB21L1 gene.

Function

This gene is similar to the MAB-21 cell fate-determining gene found in C. elegans. It may be involved in eye and cerebellum development, and it has been proposed that expansion of a trinucleotide repeat region in the 5' UTR may play a role in a variety of psychiatric disorders. [provided by RefSeq, Oct 2008].

References

Further reading